Lynott is a surname. People with that name include:

James E. Lynott (1839-1890), Canadian political figure
Phil Lynott (1949-1986), principal songwriter of Irish hard rock band Thin Lizzy
Philomena Lynott (born 1930), his mother

See also
 Linotte, a programming language
 Lynn Ott, American snowboarder